Sufmi Dasco Ahmad (born 7 October 1967) is an Indonesian politician and businessman. He currently serves as a Deputy Speaker of the People's Representative Council.

Early life and education
Ahmad was born in Bandung, West Java on 7 October 1967. He completed elementary school in Palembang, middle school in Jakarta, and high school in Manado. After graduating from high school, he enrolled in the engineering department of Pancasila University, studying electrical engineering. He obtained a bachelor's degree from there in 1993, and he later studied law in several other universities.

Career

In Gerindra
After working for some time, Ahmad had done some business with Fadli Zon, and from this connection, he entered politics. Ahmad became a founding member of the Great Indonesia Movement Party (Gerindra), and in 2008 he was appointed as the chairman of its central committee. Following the 2014 elections, Ahmad was elected into the People's Representative Council, representing the Banten III electoral district with 56,323 votes. In his first term, he was part of the council's third commission on law, human rights, and security, in addition to chairing the body's ethics council. Within Gerindra, he later became a deputy chairman.

In October 2017, Ahmad accused the Indonesian Police of bias against Gerindra. He also stated that communism in Indonesia had the potential to "revive and spread overseas".

Deputy speaker
Ahmad was reelected to the council from the same district with 99,002 votes following the 2019 elections, and he was appointed as one of the body's deputy speakers.

References

1967 births
Great Indonesia Movement Party politicians
People from Bandung
Members of the People's Representative Council, 2014
Members of the People's Representative Council, 2019
Living people